The Steinfeld Trophy was a trophy given annually to the winners of the Major League Lacrosse (MLL) championship. The trophy is contested in a 4-team playoff where the top teams (based on regular season record) compete in a single-elimination format. In 2002 and since 2014, the semifinals and the championship game are on separate weekends. The award is named after MLL co-founder Jake Steinfeld. Since the league's inception, the championship has been played at a pre-designated neutral location.

Finals

Championship game

MLL playoffs 

[a] played 2001 to 2008
[b] played 2006 to 2010
[c] played 2006 to 2008
[d] played 2009 to 2013

All-time playoff records

References

Major League Lacrosse awards